Alexander Molerio (born 19 September 1991) is a Cuban sports shooter. He competed in the men's 10 metre air rifle event at the 2016 Summer Olympics.

References

External links
 

1991 births
Living people
Cuban male sport shooters
Olympic shooters of Cuba
Shooters at the 2016 Summer Olympics
Place of birth missing (living people)
Shooters at the 2015 Pan American Games
Pan American Games competitors for Cuba